Psychostrophia melanargia is a moth of the family Epicopeiidae first described by Arthur Gardiner Butler in 1877. It is found in Japan.

The wingspan is 32–39 mm.

References

Moths described in 1877
Epicopeiidae
Moths of Japan